The 2007 WCHA Men's Ice Hockey Tournament was the 48th conference playoff in league history and 53rd season where a WCHA champion was crowned. The 2007 tournament was played between March 9 and March 17, 2007, at five conference arenas and the Xcel Energy Center in St. Paul, Minnesota. By winning the tournament, Minnesota was awarded the Broadmoor Trophy and received the WCHA's automatic bid to the NCAA Tournament.

Format
The first round of the postseason tournament featured a best-of-three games format. All ten conference schools participated in the tournament with teams seeded No. 1 through No. 10 according to their final conference standing, with a tiebreaker system used to seed teams with an identical number of points accumulated. The top five seeded teams each earned home ice and hosted one of the lower seeded teams.

The winners of the first round series advanced to the Xcel Energy Center for the WCHA Final Five, the collective name for the quarterfinal, semifinal, and championship rounds. The Final Five uses a single-elimination format. Teams were re-seeded No. 1 through No. 5 according to the final regular season conference standings, with the top three teams automatically advancing to the semifinals.

Conference standings
Note: PTS = Points; GP = Games played; W = Wins; L = Losses; T = Ties; GF = Goals For; GA = Goals Against

Bracket
Teams are reseeded after the first round

Note: * denotes overtime period(s)

First round

(1) Minnesota vs. (10) Alaska-Anchorage

(2) St. Cloud State vs. (9) Minnesota-Duluth

(3) North Dakota vs. (8) Minnesota State

(4) Denver vs. (7) Wisconsin

(5) Colorado College vs. (6) Michigan Tech

Quarterfinal

(6) Michigan Tech vs. (7) Wisconsin

Semifinals

(1) Minnesota vs. (7) Wisconsin

(2) St. Cloud State vs. (3) North Dakota

Third Place

(2) St. Cloud State vs. (7) Wisconsin

Championship

(1) Minnesota vs. (3) North Dakota

Tournament awards

All-Tournament Team
F Blake Wheeler* (Minnesota)
F Jonathan Toews (North Dakota)
F Jake Dowell (Wisconsin)
D Mike Vannelli (Minnesota)
D Taylor Chorney (North Dakota)
G Philippe Lamoureux (North Dakota)
* Most Valuable Player(s)

See also
Western Collegiate Hockey Association men's champions

References

External links
WCHA official site
2006–07 WCHA Standings
2006–07 NCAA Standings

WCHA Men's Ice Hockey Tournament
WCHA Men's Ice Hockey Tournament